Ken LeBlanc (born December 4, 1967) is a Canadian entrepreneur, franchisor, and real estate analyst born in Moncton, New Brunswick. In 1998 LeBlanc co-founded PropertyGuys.com. As President and CEO, LeBlanc has overseen the company's growth from a single Moncton location to an organization with over 120 franchises serving over 600 communities across Canada and the USA.
LeBlanc is the youngest person ever named to the Atlantic Business Magazine Hall-of-Fame, and one of the first New Brunswickers. In November 2009 LeBlanc became the first known "honorary dragon" of the Canadian version of the television programme Dragons' Den during an event promoting Global Entrepreneurship Week.

Ken is considered one of the Top 5 people in Canada who are changing Real Estate - http://business.financialpost.com/financial-post-magazine/canada-real-estate-industry-leaders

In 2017 Ken helped expand PropertyGuys.com to an international stage by launching in Australia https://ca.finance.yahoo.com/news/propertyguys-com-ready-international-stage-130000367.html

In 2018 Ken lead the expansion of PropertyGuys.com into the US via a Master Franchise Agreement for the State of Florida
https://www.newswire.ca/news-releases/propertyguyscom-expands-into-the-united-states-with-master-agreement-that-will-add-more-than-one-hundred-new-franchises-to-its-network-700472101.html 

In 2019, Ken helped lead the team to their Texas Area Developer franchise.

In 2020, Ken lead the franchise development team to another global expansion into South Africa.

Boards 

 Venn Centre -Board of Directors https://www.venninnovation.com/en/venn-leadership
 Canadian Franchise Association - Board of Directors (Chair 2014–2016)
 Canadian Franchise Association Board of Directors 
 Canadian Youth Business Foundation https://archive.today/20130115114124/http://www.cybf.ca/about-us/board-of-directors/

Awards, nominations and honors 

 2022 PropertyGuys.com CEO Nominated for EY Entrepreneur Of The Year Atlantic Award https://conta.cc/3QhYJSo 
 2021 Canadian Franchise Association - Franchisee Choice Award
 2020 Canadian Franchise Association - Franchisee Choice Award
 2019 Canadian Franchise Association - Franchisee Choice Award
 2018 Canadian Franchise Association - Franchisee Choice Award
 2018 Franchise Business Review Top 50 
 2017 Canadian Franchise Association - Franchisee Choice Award
 2016 Canadian Franchise Association - Franchisee Choice Award
 2015 Franchise Satisfaction Awards - Franchise Business Review Top 50
 2015 Canadian Franchise Association - Franchisee Choice Award
 2014 Canadian Franchise Association - Franchisee Choice Award
 2013 Atlantic Finalist for the Ernst & Young Entrepreneur Of The Year Award
 2013 Canadian Franchise Association - Franchisee Choice Awards
 2013 Atlantic Business Magazine "Wall of Fame" at the Halifax International Airport - Inductee
 2012 Canadian Franchise Association - Franchisee Choice Awards
 2012 Canadian Franchise Association Board of Directors - 1st Vice Chair
 2011 G20 Youth Entrepreneurship Summit - Canadian Representative (Nice, France)
 2010 G20 Youth Entrepreneurship Summit - Canadian Representative (Toronto, Canada)
 2009 Special "Guest Dragon" on CBC Dragons’ Den – YPG Live Edition
 2009 Canadian Franchise Association Board of Directors - 2nd Vice Chair
 2008 Inducted into Atlantic Business Magazine's Top 50 CEOs Hall of Fame
 Named a New Brunswick ambassador in 2008
 2007 Atlantic Finalist for the Ernst & Young Entrepreneur Of The Year Award
 2007 Named by Atlantic Business Magazine to Atlantic Canada's top-50 CEOs list
 2006 Named by Atlantic Business Magazine to Atlantic Canada's top-50 CEOs list
 2005 Named by Atlantic Business Magazine to Atlantic Canada's top-50 CEOs list
 Nominated for Canada's outstanding CEO of the Year Award 2004
 2004 Named by Atlantic Business Magazine to Atlantic Canada's top-50 CEOs list
 2003 Named by Atlantic Business Magazine to Atlantic Canada's top-50 CEOs list
 Business Development Bank of Canada (BDC) Young Entrepreneur of the Year, 2002

References

Living people
Businesspeople from New Brunswick
1969 births
People from Moncton
Canadian chief executives
Canadian real estate businesspeople